Parliamentary elections were held in Benin on 28 March 1995, although voting for thirteen seats was re-run on 28 May after the Supreme Court invalidated the results due to irregularities. The Democratic Renewal Party emerged as the largest party in the National Assembly, winning 19 of the 83 seats. Voter turnout was 75.8%.

Results

References

 

Benin
Elections in Benin
1995 in Benin
Election and referendum articles with incomplete results